Lee Seoung-hyun (born April 16, 1992) is a South Korean professional basketball player for the Jeonju KCC Egis of the Korean Basketball League.

He represented South Korea's national basketball team at the 2016 FIBA Asia Challenge, where he recorded most minutes for his team.

References

External links
Asia-Basket.com profile
Korea’s future may hinge on Lee Seung-Hyun Article on HoopNut.net

1992 births
Living people
People from Gumi, North Gyeongsang
Sportspeople from North Gyeongsang Province
Centers (basketball)
Power forwards (basketball)
Goyang Carrot Jumpers players
Jeonju KCC Egis players
South Korean men's basketball players
Basketball players at the 2018 Asian Games
Asian Games bronze medalists for South Korea
Medalists at the 2018 Asian Games
Asian Games medalists in basketball
2019 FIBA Basketball World Cup players